Big Sandy Creek is a tributary of the Milk River, approximately 50 miles (80 kilometers) long, in northwestern Montana in the United States.

It rises in the southern Rocky Boys Indian Reservation in the Bears Paw Mountains and flows southwest, then north past Box Elder, then northeast, joined by Sage Creek, and joins the Milk approximately 10 mi (16 km) west of Havre.

Variant names
Big Sandy Creek has also been known as: Ahmi-Saptsiko, Sand Creek, and Un-es-putcha-eka.

See also

 List of rivers of Montana
 Montana Stream Access Law

Notes

Rivers of Montana
Bodies of water of Hill County, Montana
Rivers of Chouteau County, Montana